Kahe may refer to:

Places 
Kahe, Tanzania, a group of wards in northeastern Tanzania
Battle of Kahe, fought during the East African Campaign of World War I
Kahe Mashariki, a town and ward in northeastern Tanzania
Kahak, Razavi Khorasan, a village in Iran known as Kahe

People 
Kahê (born 1982), nickname of Brazilian football player Carlos Eduardo de Souza Floresta
Kahe Te Rau-o-te-rangi (died 1871), New Zealand te ati awa leader, trader and innkeeper

Other 
Kahe language, of Tanzania
KAHE, American radio station 
Kahe Gaye Pardes Piya, a 2009 Indian film